WKBW is a call sign which has been used on two broadcast stations in Buffalo, New York:

WKBW-TV (channel 34, virtual 7)
WKBW Radio AM 1520, Now WWKB